Matthew James Tweedley (born 16 April 2004) is an English footballer who plays as a midfielder for League One side Bolton Wanderers.

Playing career
Tweedley came through the Bolton Wanderers Reserves Academy, which he joined at the age of five.

Tweedley made his Bolton debut on 30 November 2021 in a 1–0 victory against Fleetwood Town in the EFL Trophy, coming on in the 83rd minute as a substitute for Oladapo Afolayan.

On 13 June 2022, Tweedley became one of the five Academy graduates that signed their first professional contracts with Bolton.

Statistics

Notes

References

2004 births
Living people
Association football midfielders
English footballers
Bolton Wanderers F.C. players
English Football League players
Footballers from Rochdale